Brookfield Township is the name of some places in the U.S. state of Michigan:

 Brookfield Township, Eaton County, Michigan
 Brookfield Township, Huron County, Michigan

See also 
 Brookfield Township (disambiguation)

Michigan township disambiguation pages